Mike Carman (born April 14, 1988) is an American bandy player and former professional ice hockey player. He played in the American Hockey League for the Lake Erie Monsters, Hershey Bears and the  Wilkes-Barre Scranton Penguins. He was selected by the Colorado Avalanche in the 3rd round (81st overall) of the 2006 NHL Entry Draft.

Playing career
Prior to turning professional, Carman played attended the University of Minnesota where he played four seasons of college hockey with the NCAA Division I Minnesota Golden Gophers men's ice hockey team.

On March 19, 2010, the Colorado Avalanche signed Carman to an entry level contract. On February 2, 2012, Carman was traded by the Avalanche to the Washington Capitals in exchange for Danny Richmond.

On September 19, after failing to earn a new contract with the Capitals, Carman accepted a try-out contract to attend the Wilkes-Barre/Scranton Penguins training camp for the 2013–14 season. After 13 games into the season, Carman was signed to an AHL with Wilkes-Barre/Scranton for the remainder of the year on December 2, 2013.

After a solitary seasons with the Penguins, without NHL interest as a free agent Carman opted to end his professional career on September 29, 2014.

Carman keeping physically active later represented the United States national bandy team during the 2015 Bandy World Championship.

Career statistics

Regular season and playoffs

International

References

External links

1988 births
American bandy players
American men's ice hockey centers
Colorado Avalanche draft picks
Hershey Bears players
Ice hockey players from Minnesota
Lake Erie Monsters players
Living people
Minnesota Golden Gophers men's ice hockey players
USA Hockey National Team Development Program players
Wilkes-Barre/Scranton Penguins players